Forsskaolea is a small genus of 7 species of perennial herbs in the nettle family with non-stinging hairs and dot-like concretions of mineral matter on their green parts. The genus was named in honor of Swedish botanist Peter Forsskål.

Description
Leaves The leaves have three ribs, are alternate, scalloped and with toothlike projections along the edges.
Flowers Budding flowers are flat-topped clusters and bisexual and from the base stem, enclosed in bell shaped, densely hairy, rings of 3-6 bracts.  Flowers are minute and unisexual with the female surrounded by a ring of male flowers.  Male flowers have 3-5 lobed calyx and the females have none.  Solitary stamen, upright wooly ovaries with no style.
Seeds Achenes oval to elliptical, flattened, densely hairy and enveloped in wooly bracts.

Distribution
Forsskaolea have found homes in the southern parts of the Palearctic from the Canary Isles and southeast Spain then eastwards to Pakistan and western India.

Species
Species accepted by the Plants of the World Online as of December 2022: 
Forsskaolea angustifolia  Retz.
Forsskaolea candida L.f.
Forsskaolea griersonii A.G.Mill. & J.A.Nyberg
Forsskaolea hereroensis Schinz
Forsskaolea procridifolia Webb
Forsskaolea tenacissima L.
Forsskaolea viridis Ehrenb. ex Webb

References

External links

 
Urticaceae genera